These are the official results of the men's 4 × 400 metres relay event at the 1968 Summer Olympics in Mexico City, Mexico.

Medalists

Final

Heats

Heat 1

Heat 2

Heat 3

References

External links
 Official Report
 Results

R
Relay foot races at the Olympics
Men's events at the 1968 Summer Olympics